Miriam Bravo Acha (born 29 September 1974 in Deba, Gipuzkoa) is a retired Spanish sprinter and runner.

In the 800 metres she finished fifth at the 2001 Mediterranean Games and sixth at the 2001 Summer Universiade. In the 400 metres she finished ninth at the 2002 IAAF World Cup.

Bravo has 2:01.80 minutes personal best in the 800 metres, achieved in June 2001 in Seville; and 53.29 seconds in the 400 metres, achieved in July 2000 in Madrid.

She went in representation of Spain in the Sydney Olympic Games in the 2.000
She was the champion and sub champion of Spain of 400 and 800 meters

References

1974 births
Living people
Spanish female sprinters
Spanish female middle-distance runners
Athletes (track and field) at the 2000 Summer Olympics
Olympic athletes of Spain
Sportspeople from Gipuzkoa
Athletes from the Basque Country (autonomous community)
Mediterranean Games bronze medalists for Spain
Mediterranean Games medalists in athletics
Athletes (track and field) at the 2001 Mediterranean Games
Olympic female sprinters
21st-century Spanish women